Curt Hagman (born January 2, 1965) is a former Republican member of the California State Assembly, representing the 55th district. Prior to serving as state assemblyman, Hagman was the Mayor of Chino Hills and also owner of Apex Bail Bonds.

Education
Hagman earned a Bachelor of Arts degree from UCLA. Hagman was a member of Phi Gamma Delta. He was also in the Navy ROTC.

Career
As a businessman, Hagman is the owner of Apex Bail Bonds with 3 offices in Southern California.

In 2004, Hagman served on the Chino Hills City Council, until 2008.
In 2008, Hagman became the Mayor of Chino Hills, California.

Hagman was elected to the 55th district state assembly in 2008, winning 55.9% of the vote. He was re-elected in November 2010 with 65.3% of the vote.

In 2014, Hagman won the election for the San Bernardino County Board of Supervisors. He was opposed by U.S. Representative Gloria Negrete McLeod.

Personal life 
Hagman's wife is Grace Hagman. They have two children. They live in Chino Hills.

References

External links 
 Curt Hagman at ballotpedia.org
 Join California Curt Hagman

1965 births
Living people
American deputy sheriffs
California city council members
Mayors of places in California
Republican Party members of the California State Assembly
People from Chino Hills, California
People from La Mirada, California
University of California, Los Angeles alumni
21st-century American politicians